The 2013 Kentucky Drillers season was the third season for the Continental Indoor Football League (CIFL) franchise.

On July 19, 2012, it was announced that the Drillers would leave the UIFL and join the Continental Indoor Football League, as well as change their name to the Kentucky Drillers.

Roster

Schedule

Regular season

Standings

Coaching staff

References

2013 Continental Indoor Football League season
Kentucky Drillers
Kentucky Drillers